The 2019–20 season was the 93rd in FC Barcelona's history, and the club's 55th consecutive season in the top flight of Spanish basketball and its 21st consecutive season in the EuroLeague. It was the third consecutive season under head coach Svetislav Pešić, who signed in February 2018.

Times up to 26 October 2019 and from 29 March 2020 were CEST (UTC+2). Times from 27 October 2019 to 28 March 2020 were CET (UTC+1).

Overview
On 6 July 2019, Nikola Mirotić of the Milwaukee Bucks signed a three-year contract with Barcelona. It was reported that Mirotić' contract was worth € 26 million, making him the highest-paid basketball player in Europe.

Players

Squad information

Transactions

In

|}

Out

|}

Pre-season and friendlies

Friendly match

Lliga Catalana

Torneo Xacobeo

Competitions

Overview

Liga ACB

League table

Results summary

Results by round

Matches

Playoffs

Group stage

Semifinals

Final

EuroLeague

League table

Results summary

Results by round

Matches

Copa del Rey

Quarterfinals

Supercopa de España

Semifinals

Final

Statistics

Liga ACB

Source: ACB

EuroLeague

Source: EuroLeague

Copa del Rey

Source: ACB

Supercopa de España

Source: ACB

Notes

References

External links
 

 
Barcelona
Barcelona